A light-on-dark color scheme —also called black mode, dark mode, dark theme, night mode, or lights-out (mode)— is a color scheme that uses light-colored text, icons, and graphical user interface elements on a dark background. It is often discussed in terms of computer user interface design and web design. Many modern websites and operating systems offer the user an optional light-on-dark display mode.

Some users find dark mode displays more visually appealing, and claim that it can reduce eye strain. Displaying white at full brightness uses roughly six times as much power as pure black on a 2016 Google Pixel, which has an OLED display. However, conventional LED displays cannot benefit from reduced power consumption. Most modern operating systems support an optional light-on-dark color scheme.

History 

Predecessors of modern computer screens, such as cathode-ray oscillographs, oscilloscopes, etc., tended to plot graphs and introduce other content as glowing traces on a black background.

With the introduction of computer screens, originally user interfaces were formed on cathode-ray tubes (CRTs) like those used for oscillographs or oscilloscopes. The phosphor was normally a very dark color, and lit up brightly when the electron beam hit it, appearing to be white, green, blue, or amber on a black background, depending on phosphors applied on a monochrome screen. RGB screens continued to operate similarly, using all the beams set to "on" to form white.

With the advent of teletext, research was done into which primary and secondary light colors and combinations worked best for this new medium. Cyan or yellow on black was typically found to be optimal from a palette of black, red, green, yellow, blue, magenta, cyan and white.

The opposite color set, a dark-on-light color scheme, was originally introduced in WYSIWYG word processors to simulate ink on paper, and became the norm.

In 2018, Apple followed in macOS Mojave. In September 2019, iOS 13 and Android 10 both introduced dark modes.

Firefox and Chromium have optional dark theme for all internal screens. It will also be possible for third-party developers to implement their own dark themes.

In 2019, a "prefers-color-scheme" option was created for front-end web developers, being a CSS property that signals a user's choice for their system to use a light or dark color theme.

Energy usage 
Light on dark color schemes require less energy to display on OLED displays. This positively impacts battery life and energy consumption.

While an OLED will consume around 40% of the power of an LCD displaying an image that is primarily black, it can use more than three times as much power to display an image with a white background, such as a document or web site. This can lead to reduced battery life and energy usage unless a light-on-dark color scheme is used. The long-term reduced power usage may also prolong battery life or the useful life of the display and battery. 

The energy savings that can be achieved using a light-on-dark color scheme are because of how OLED screens work: in an OLED screen, each subpixel generates its own light and it only consumes power when generating light. This is in contrast to how an LCD works: in an LCD, subpixels either block or allow light from an always-on (lit) LED backlight to pass through.

"AMOLED Black" color schemes (that use pure black instead of dark gray) do not necessarily save more energy than other light-on-dark color schemes that use dark gray instead of black, as the power consumption on an AMOLED screen decreases proportionately to the average brightness of the displayed pixels. Although it is true that AMOLED black does save more energy than dark gray, the additional energy savings are often negligible; AMOLED black will only give an additional energy saving of less than 1%, for instance, over the dark gray that's used in the dark theme for Google's official Android apps. In November 2018, Google confirmed that dark mode on Android saved battery life.

Issues with the web 
Some argue that a color scheme with light text on a dark background is easier to read on the screen, because the lower overall brightness causes less eyestrain. Others argue to the contrary. The caveat is that most pages on the web are designed for white backgrounds; GIF and PNG images with a transparency bit instead of alpha channels tend to show up with choppy outlines, as well as causing problems with other graphical elements.

There is a prefers-color-scheme media feature on CSS, to detect if the user has requested light or dark color scheme and serve the requested color scheme. It can be indicated from the user's operating system preference or a user agent.

CSS example:
@media (prefers-color-scheme: dark) {
    body {
        color: #ccc;
        background: #222;
    }
}

JavaScript example:
if (window.matchMedia('(prefers-color-scheme: dark)').matches) {
    dark();
}

See also 
 AMOLED
Blackle
Night Shift (software)
 OLED
Solarized (color scheme)

References 

User interfaces
Display technology
Color schemes
Computer graphics